Kathryn Lane  (born 27 February 1995) is an English international field hockey player who played as a defender for England.

She plays club hockey in the Women's England Hockey League Premier Division for Clifton Robinsons.

Lane has also played for Beeston and Leicester.

References

1995 births
Living people
English female field hockey players
Commonwealth Games medallists in field hockey
Commonwealth Games bronze medallists for England
Female field hockey defenders
Sportspeople from Derby
Women's England Hockey League players
Field hockey players at the 2018 Commonwealth Games
Medallists at the 2018 Commonwealth Games